The Whittington Stone is an 1821 monumental stone and statue of a cat at the foot of Highgate Hill, a street, in Archway. This quotation and a short history of the man cover two faces of the stone. The pub next to it is of the same name.

Details

The large tablet was erected in 1821, restored in 1935, and the cat sculpture was added in 1964. It is a two-segment slab of Portland stone, "the inscription to the south-west side now almost completely eroded, that to the north-east [tells] the career of the medieval merchant and City dignitary Sir Richard Whittington (c.1354–1423), including his [three/four] terms as Lord Mayor". The memorial marks the site where 'Dick Whittington', returning home discouraged after a disastrous attempt to make his fortune in the City, heard the bells of St Mary-le-Bow ring out, 'Turn again Whittington, thrice Lord Mayor of London.'  On top is the 1964 sculpture of a cat by Jonathan Kenworthy, in polished-black Kellymount limestone. Iron railings, oval in plan, with upper flourishes and spearhead finials above and an intersecting circular return (an "overthrow"), surround it.  The stone and railings are negligibly raised by a small broad stone plinth mainly set into the surrounding pavement. It has had statutory protection as listed, in the initial grade II category, since 1972.

The location of the stone was considered the northern part of Upper Holloway, until some decades after the nearby arched bridge was built in the early 19th century.

Other legacies

Aside from cultural references including a nursery rhyme, story and plays, the Lord Mayor was praised for ensuring the building of a maternity hospital and drains for the poor of London during his lifetime. He left his wealth to a broad-based charity which continues into the 21st century helping people in need.

References

English folklore
Monuments and memorials in London
Grade II listed buildings in the London Borough of Islington
Cat monuments